Dörthe Binkert (born 1 January 1949) is a German novelist and non-fiction writer.

Biography
Born in Hagen in Westphalia, Binkert grew up in Frankfurt where she studied German literature, art history and politics at Frankfurt University. For the next 30 years she worked as editor and editor-in-chief for major German publishers. Since 1975 she has been living in Zurich where she completed her first historical novel, Weit übers Meer (translated as She Wore Only White), in 2008. It is the story of a young woman who is trying to escape her past by taking a transatlantic voyage to America.

Selected works

Novels

Non-fiction

References

External links
Dörte Binkert's website (in German)

1949 births
Living people
People from Hagen
21st-century German novelists
21st-century German women writers
German women novelists
Goethe University Frankfurt alumni